The 1981–82 Ohio Bobcats men's basketball team represented Ohio University as a member of the Mid-American Conference in the college basketball season of 1981–82. The team was coached by Danny Nee in his second season at Ohio. They played their home games at Convocation Center. The Bobcats finished with a record of 13–14 and sixth in the MAC regular season with a conference record of 8–8.

Schedule

|-
!colspan=9 style=| Regular Season

|-
!colspan=9 style=| MAC Tournament

Source:

Statistics

Team Statistics
Final 1981–82 Statistics

Source

Statistics

Team Statistics
"Final 1980–81 Statistics"

Source

Player statistics

Source

References

Ohio Bobcats men's basketball seasons
Ohio
Ohio Bobcats men's basketball
Ohio Bobcats men's basketball